Sisters is a popular song written by Irving Berlin in 1954, best known from the 1954 film White Christmas.

Recordings

White Christmas
Trudy Stevens provided the singing voice for Vera-Ellen in "Sisters". The first edition of Vera-Ellen's biography by David Soren made the mistake of suggesting that "perhaps" Clooney sang for Vera in "Sisters". The second edition of the biography corrected that error by adding this: "Appropriately, they sing "Sisters" with Rosemary Clooney actually dueting with Trudy Stabile (wife of popular bandleader Dick Stabile), who sang under the stage name Trudy Stevens and who had been personally recommended for the dubbing part by Clooney. Originally, Gloria Wood was going to do Vera-Ellen's singing until Clooney intervened on behalf of her friend."

White Christmas also starred Bing Crosby and Danny Kaye. It was not possible to issue an "original soundtrack album" of the film, because Decca Records controlled the soundtrack rights, but Clooney was under exclusive contract with Columbia Records. Consequently, each one issued a separate "soundtrack recording": Decca issuing Selections from Irving Berlin's White Christmas, while Columbia issued Irving Berlin's White Christmas. On the former, the song "Sisters" (as well as all of Clooney's vocal parts) was recorded by Peggy Lee, while on the latter, the song was sung by Rosemary Clooney and her own sister, Betty. The Clooney sisters' version, which was also released as a single, was the most popular recording of the song, charting in 1954.

Cover versions 
The song was also made famous in the United Kingdom by sister act the Beverley Sisters.

Bette Midler Sings the Rosemary Clooney Songbook, a 2003 album of songs made famous by Rosemary Clooney, done by Bette Midler, included a version of the song done by Linda Ronstadt and Midler.

References

1954 songs
Songs written by Irving Berlin
Rosemary Clooney songs